The 2007 World Single Distance Speed Skating Championships were held between March 8 and March 11, 2007, in the Utah Olympic Oval. Twelve events were held, and world records were broken in five events.

Schedule

Medal summary

Men's events

Women's events

Medal table

References
 Official results

World Single Distance Championships
2007 World Single Distance
World Single Distance Speed Skating Championships, 2007
World Single Distance, 2007
World Single Distance Speed Skating Championships
Sports in Utah